The 1982 FIFA World Cup took place in Spain from 13 June to 11 July 1982. Each of the 24 participating nations had to submit a squad of no more than 22 players, three of whom had to be goalkeepers. The El Salvador squad comprised just 20 players.

Group 1

Cameroon
Head coach:  Jean Vincent

Italy

Head coach: Enzo Bearzot

Note: With the exception of the goalkeepers, who were assigned the traditional shirt numbers for the role (1, 12 and 22) the Italian team was numbered alphabetically within their respective positions – Defenders (from 2 to 8), Midfielders (from 9 to 14), Wingers (from 15 to 17) and Forwards (from 18 to 21).

Peru

Head coach:  Tim

Poland

Head coach: Antoni Piechniczek

Group 2

Algeria

Head coaches: Mahieddine Khalef and Rachid Mekhloufi

Austria

Head coaches: Felix Latzke and Georg Schmidt

Chile

Head coach: Luis Santibáñez

West Germany

Head coach: Jupp Derwall

Although they were in the list, they didn't travel to Spain and stayed in West Germany as reserves, waiting if Derwall would require their services. He didn't. (in Spanish)

Group 3

Argentina

Head coach: César Luis Menotti

Note that this squad is numbered alphabetically by surname, unlike traditional numbering systems where the goalkeeper has shirt number 1 and so forth. However, Diego Maradona and Patricio Hernández were swapped round to give Maradona his favoured 10.

Belgium

Head coach: Guy Thys

Jozef Daerden was a replacement to René Vandereycken in at the last moment due to an injury of the latter.

El Salvador

Head coach: Mauricio Rodríguez

Only 20 players in El Salvador's squad.

Hungary

Head coach: Kálmán Mészöly

Group 4

Czechoslovakia
Head coach: Jozef Vengloš

England
Head coach: Ron Greenwood

Note that this squad is numbered alphabetically by surname, unlike traditional numbering systems. Despite this, the goalkeepers are given the usual England goalkeepers' shirts 1, 13 & 22 (again alphabetically) and Kevin Keegan is given his favoured 7.

France
Head coach: Michel Hidalgo

Note: This squad is numbered alphabetically within the players' positions, including the goalkeepers. The exception is Michel Platini, who was given his favoured number 10.

Kuwait
Head coach:  Carlos Alberto Parreira

Group 5

Honduras

Head coach: José de la Paz Herrera

Northern Ireland

Head coach: Billy Bingham

Spain

Head coach:  José Santamaría

Yugoslavia

Head coach: Miljan Miljanić

Group 6

Brazil

Head coach: Telê Santana

New Zealand

Head coach:  John Adshead

Scotland

Head coach: Jock Stein

Soviet Union

Head coach: Konstantin Beskov

References

External links
Planet World Cup website
 weltfussball.de WM 1982 in Spanien – Mannschaften

FIFA World Cup squads
Squads